LEG Immobilien AG (Landesentwicklungsgesellschaft) is a German property company. As of 2016, it is a constituent of the MDAX trading index of German mid-cap companies.

The company was established as a housing provider operating in the German Land of Nordrhein-Westfalen. It was later privatised and currently operates as an Aktiengesellschaft (publicly traded company). The headquarters is located in Düsseldorf, the Land capital (Landeshauptstadt) of Nordrhein-Westfalen.

As of 2016, the company has around 1000 employees and holds around 130,000 apartments and properties. A takeover bid by Deutsche Wohnen failed in 2015.

References

External links
  (English)
 Financial Times
 Bloomberg

Companies based in Düsseldorf
Companies listed on the Frankfurt Stock Exchange
Companies in the MDAX